Novosilskoye is a rural locality (a selo) and the administrative center of Novosilskoye Rural Settlement, Semiluksky District, Voronezh Oblast, Russia. The population was 1,038 as of 2010. There are 22 streets.

Geography 
Novosilskoye is located 58 km northwest of Semiluki (the district's administrative centre) by road. Dolgo-Makhovatka is the nearest rural locality.

References 

Rural localities in Semiluksky District